Tri Sestry is a stratovolcano located in the central part of Urup Island, Kuril Islands, Russia.

See also
 List of volcanoes in Russia

References 
 

Urup
Mountains of the Kuril Islands
Volcanoes of the Kuril Islands
Stratovolcanoes of Russia
Holocene stratovolcanoes
Holocene Asia